Daniel Allen 'Dan' Carp (born 1948) is the former chairman and chief executive officer of the Eastman Kodak Company.  Carp served as the chairman of the board of Delta Air Lines, replacing former chairman Gerald Grinstein.  A native of Wytheville, Virginia, Carp currently lives in Naples, Florida.

Carp joined Kodak in 1970 as a statistical analyst and held a variety of positions throughout his career before becoming president and CEO in 1999. Carp stepped down as president and CEO in 2005 and was succeeded by Antonio M. Pérez.  On December 31, 2005, Perez took over as chairman of the board. Carp went on to join Delta Air Lines, serving as the airline's non-executive chairman until May 2016.

His education includes a BBA in quantitative methods from the Ohio University, an MBA from the Rochester Institute of Technology, and a Master's degree in Management (M.B.A.) as a Sloan Fellow at the MIT Sloan School of Management in 1988.

Carp currently serves on the board of directors at Texas Instruments and Norfolk Southern Corp.

Career timeline

 1970 - Began career at Eastman Kodak
 1986 - Assistant general manager of the Latin American Region
 1988 - Elected vice president and general manager of the Latin American Region
 1990 - General manager of the European Marketing Companies
 October, 1991 - General manager of the European, African, and Middle Eastern Region
 November 1, 1995 - Elected executive vice president and assistant chief operating officer
 January 1, 1997 - Elected president and chief operating officer
 December 12, 1997 - Elected to the board of directors
 January 1, 2000 to December 8, 2000 - President and chief executive officer
 December 8, 2000 to April 16, 2001 - Chairman, president, and chief executive officer
 April 16, 2001 to January 4, 2002 - Chairman and chief executive officer
 January 4, 2002 to April 2, 2003 - Chairman, chief executive officer, president, and chief operating officer
 April 2, 2003 to May 31, 2005 - Chairman and chief executive officer
 June 1, 2005 to December 31, 2005 - Chairman

Personal life
 November 3, 2006 - Became a grandpa

Awards
 1997 - Human Relations Award of the American Jewish Committee Photographic Imaging Division
 2000 - Alumni Hall of Distinction of the New York State Commission on Independent Colleges and Universities
 2001 - Photographic & Imaging Manufacturers Association Leadership Award
 2003 - Diversity Best Practices CEO Leadership Award
 2004 - PhotoImaging Manufacturers & Distributors Association Person of the Year Award
 2005 - Corning Award for Excellence

References

External links
 Kodak Biography
 Carp Profile on Forbes.com
 Alumni Hall of Distinction
 Carp's Success Story

1948 births
Living people
MIT Sloan Fellows
MIT Sloan School of Management alumni
Ohio University alumni
People from Wytheville, Virginia
Rochester Institute of Technology alumni
Kodak people
American chief executives